Stéphanie Empain (born on 11 August 1983 in Luxembourg City) is a Luxembourgian politician of The Greens party.

Biography

Studies and professional career 
She studied political science and obtained a Master of Arts degree. She served in the general staff of the Luxembourg Army for two years, then she worked as the head of the Oesling regional tourism office for six years.

In 2015, she founded a company that produces reusable nappies for infants.

On December 1st, 2018, she succeeded  as the chairwoman of the Luxembourg Athletics Federation.

Political activity 
Empain was active within the youth section of The Greens party for several years. She stood in the 2018 general election after Françoise Folmer resigned from the co-chairwomanship of the party. Following the election, Claude Turmes became the Minister of Planning and Energy within the Bettel–Schneider Ministry II and was replaced by Empain as one of the deputies of the Nord constituency.

Private life 
Empain is a married mother of two and resides in Erpeldange.

References 

Living people
1983 births
21st-century Luxembourgian politicians
21st-century Luxembourgian women politicians
The Greens (Luxembourg) politicians
Members of the Chamber of Deputies (Luxembourg) from Nord
Luxembourgian businesspeople
People from Luxembourg City